Kerosene is a type of fuel. It may also refer to:
 "Kerosene", a song by Bad Religion from their album Recipe for Hate.
 "Kerosene", a song by Big Black from their album Atomizer.
 "Kerosene", a song by Crystal Castles, from their album (III).
 "Kerosene", a song by Biig Piig, from her mixtape Bubblegum.
 Kerosene (album), the debut album of Miranda Lambert.
"Kerosene" (song), the title track to this album
 Kerosene, a novel written by Chris Wooding

See also
 Paraffin (disambiguation)
 Kerosene lamp
 Pressurised-burner stoves
 Naphtha